Latham & Watkins LLP is an American multinational law firm. Founded in 1934 in Los Angeles, California, Latham is the second-largest law firm in the world by revenue. As of 2022, Latham is also one of the most profitable law firms in the world, with profits per partner exceeding US$5.7 million.

History 
The firm was founded in January 1934 in Los Angeles, California, by Dana Latham and Paul Watkins. Latham's practice focused on state and federal tax law, and he eventually served as Commissioner of the U.S. Internal Revenue Service under President Dwight Eisenhower. Watkins's practice focused primarily on labor. At first, the firm grew slowly, with only 19 attorneys employed as of 1960. Beginning in the 1970s, the firm began growing rapidly, opening new offices in Orange County, Washington D.C., San Diego, Chicago, and New York. In the 1990s, the firm opened its first international office in London. Since then, it has continued to expand internationally with 18 international offices spanning Europe, Asia-Pacific, and the Middle East.

As of 2020, the company is known for lobbying and litigating against actions to mitigate climate change. According to the Law Students for Climate Accountability, "Latham & Watkins is the only firm to be in the Top 5 Worst Firms for both transactions and litigation exacerbating climate change."

Amid the global recession in 2009, the firm laid off 190 lawyers and 250 paralegal and support staff, representing twelve percent of the firm's total associates and ten percent of the support staff. At a time when many firms were conducting layoffs, the term "Lathamed" became legal slang for being laid off.

At one time Latham & Watkins was considered to be the world’s largest law firm by total revenue when, in February of 2018, it surpassed $3billion in annual revenue.

, Latham's largest office is in New York City, with more than 450 lawyers. The firm claims it is the only fully integrated multinational law firm with no single headquarters. In 2007, Latham became the first American law firm to attain more than $2 billion in yearly revenue, and in 2018 it was the first law firm to report more than US$3 billion in gross revenue. As of 2018, it was briefly the highest-grossing law firm in the world, but has since lost the number one spot to Kirkland & Ellis.

Latham opened its first office in Moscow in 1992, and thereafter represented a number of Russian state-owned companies. These clients include the state-owned bank VTB and the natural gas producer Novatek.  Latham ended its Russia operations in March 2022, following Russia's invasion of Ukraine.

Rankings 
Latham was ranked as the #1 firm in the Am Law 100 rankings for 2017. In 2021, the firm received the highest number of practice and lawyer rankings from Chambers and Partners. Dubbed an "A-List All-Star" by The American Lawyer, the firm is one of three firms to appear on the A-List each year since its inception in 2003. Vault.com named Latham one of the top five most prestigious firms in the United States and the most prestigious firm in Southern California.

Notable attorneys 

Dana Latham - Commissioner of the Internal Revenue Service
Sean M. Berkowitz – Federal prosecutor in the trials of Enron executives Ken Lay and Jeffrey Skilling. Also defended Lori Loughlin in the 2019 college admissions bribery scandal.
Charles Courtenay, 19th Earl of Devon
Thomas J. Heiden - Partner and Former Global Chair of the firm.
Philip Perry – Former associate attorney general, former general counsel of the Office of Management and Budget, and former general counsel of Department of Homeland Security.
Kathryn Ruemmler – Former White House Counsel to President Barack Obama and federal prosecutor in the trials of Enron executives Ken Lay and Jeffrey Skilling.
Jonathan Lippman – Former Chief Judge of the New York Court of Appeals. 
Michael Chertoff — Former U.S. Secretary of Homeland Security 
Andrew H. Warren — State Attorney of Florida's 13th Judicial Circuit, Hillsborough County (2017–22)

See also
List of largest law firms by profits per partner

References

External links

 
Law firms established in 1934
Law firms based in Los Angeles
Foreign law firms with offices in Hong Kong
Foreign law firms with offices in Japan
1934 establishments in California